The 1994 Wagner Seahawks football team represented Wagner College in the 1994 NCAA Division I-AA football season as an independent. The Seahawks were led by 14th-year head coach Walt Hameline and played their home games at Wagner College Stadium.

Schedule

References

Wagner
Wagner Seahawks football seasons
Wagner Seahawks football